Edward A. Doherty (July 25, 1918 – January 2, 2000) was an American football player and coach. He served as head football coach at Arizona State University (1947–1950), the University of Rhode Island (1951), the University of Arizona (1957–1958), Xavier University (1959–1961), and the College of the Holy Cross (1971–1975), compiling a career college football record of 67–83–3. He is the only person to serve as head coach for in-state rivals Arizona and Arizona State.

Playing career
Doherty played quarterback at Boston College from 1941 to 1943. He was nicknamed "The Brain" for his innovative style. When most of the Boston College coaching staff left for military duty in 1943, Doherty, then a senior, was a finalist for the job of head coach. The job would eventually go to line coach Moody Sarno. Doherty was drafted by the Washington Redskins in the fifth round (39th overall) of the 1944 NFL Draft, but instead joined the United States Navy.

Coaching career
After one season as an assistant at Notre Dame in 1946, Doherty became head coach at Arizona State, where he compiled a 25–17 record from 1947 to 1950. He left after ASU five days after defeating rival Arizona, 47–13, because he felt that he didn't have enough job security.

In 1951, he coached at Rhode Island on a temporary basis after head coach Hal Kopp was called to Army active duty. He compiled a 3–5 record in his only season as coach. From 1952 to 1954, Doherty coached high school football at Punchard High School (1952) and Lawrence High School in Massachusetts (1953–1954). He returned to college football in 1957 after one season as an assistant with the Philadelphia Eagles. From 1957 to 1958, Doherty coached at Arizona, where he compiled a 4–15–1 record. Unlikely to be brought back for a third season, Doherty resigned and became head coach of Xavier University.

After two years out of the game, Doherty returned to coaching in 1964 as the head coach of St. Augustine High School in San Diego, California. From 1965-1970 he was head coach at St. Mary's High School in Phoenix, Arizona. From 1967 to 1969, Doherty coached St. Mary's to three straight state championship games, winning in 1967 and 1968. From 1971 to 1975, he coached at Holy Cross, where he compiled a 20–31–2 record. After leaving Holy Cross, Doherty returned to Arizona, where he coached Salpointe Catholic High School from 1978 to 1982 and was the school's athletic director until 1990. He coached the Lancers to the 1981 state championship game.

Honors
In 1991, Salpointe Catholic named their new stadium in honor of Doherty. The Active 20-30 Clubs of Arizona also honored Doherty by naming their high school football player of the year trophy the Ed Doherty Award.

Head coaching record

College

References

External links
 

1918 births
2000 deaths
American football quarterbacks
Arizona State Sun Devils football coaches
Boston College Eagles football players
Holy Cross Crusaders football coaches
Notre Dame Fighting Irish football coaches
Rhode Island Rams football coaches
Philadelphia Eagles coaches
Xavier Musketeers football coaches
High school football coaches in Arizona
High school football coaches in California
High school football coaches in Massachusetts
People from Andover, Massachusetts
Players of American football from Tucson, Arizona
United States Navy personnel of World War II
Sportspeople from Essex County, Massachusetts